The following is an alphabetical list of articles related to the U.S. state of Texas.

0–9 

.tx.us – Internet second-level domain for the state of Texas
7-Eleven

A
Abilene, Texas
Adams-Onís Treaty of 1819
Adjacent states:  (one of three states with eight neighbors)

Adolphus Hotel
ADV Films
Agriculture in Texas
Alamo
Alamo Village
Allen, TX
Alley Theatre
Álvar Núñez Cabeza de Vaca
Amarillo Dillas
Amarillo Gorillas
Amarillo, Texas
American Airlines
American Airlines Center
Ameriquest Field in Arlington
Amusement parks in Texas
Anahuac Disturbances
Anahuac, Texas
Anthony, Texas
Angleton, Doris
Angleton, Robert
Angleton, Roger
Aquaria in Texas
commons:Category:Aquaria in Texas
Aransas Bay
Aransas Pass
Arboreta in Texas
commons:Category:Arboreta in Texas
Archaeology of Texas
:Category:Archaeological sites in Texas
commons:Category:Archaeological sites in Texas
Architecture of Texas
Area codes in Texas
Ark-La-Tex
Arlen, Texas
Arlington Stadium
Arlington, Texas
Armadillo
Armadillo World Headquarters
ArtCar Museum
Art museums and galleries in Texas
commons:Category:Art museums and galleries in Texas
Astronomical observatories in Texas
commons:Category:Astronomical observatories in Texas
Austin, Texas
Austin-Bergstrom International Airport
Austin City Limits (television)
Austin Ice Bats
Austin, Stephen F.
Austin, Texas, republican and state capital since 1839
Austin Wranglers

B
Balcones Fault
Bank of America (Austin)
Bank of America Center, Houston
Bank of America Plaza (Dallas)
Bank One Center (Houston)
Baptist General Convention of Texas
Bartlett, Steve
Barton Springs
Barton Springs Salamander
Battle of the Alamo
Battle of Gonzales
Battle of San Jacinto
Battle of Velasco
Bauer College of Business
Bay Ridge Christian College
Baylor College of Medicine
Baylor University
Baytown, Texas
Beaches of Texas
commons:Category:Beaches of Texas
Beaumont, Texas
Bentsen, Lloyd
Bevo (mascot)
Bible Belt
Big Bend National Park
Big Tex
Bill Dauterive
Black Belt in the American South
Blaffer Gallery
Blockbuster Video
Blue Bell Creameries
Bluebonnet
Blue Line (Dallas Area Rapid Transit)
Bobby Hill (King of the Hill)
Bonnell, Joseph
Bonnie and Clyde
Boomhauer
Botanical gardens in Texas
commons:Category:Botanical gardens in Texas
Bowie, Jim
Brazoria, Texas
Brazos River
Briscoe, Dolph
Brown, Lee P.
Brownsville, Texas
Bryan, Texas
Buchanan Dam
Buildings and structures in Texas
commons:Category:Buildings and structures in Texas
Burleson, Edward
BNSF Railway
Burnet, David G.
Bush, George H. W.
Bush, George W.

C

Cabeza de Vaca, Álvar Núñez
Caddo Lake
Cadillac Ranch
Cao, Anh "Joseph"
Canyons and gorges of Texas
commons:Category:Canyons and gorges of Texas
Capital of the State of Texas
Capitol of the State of Texas
commons:Category:Texas State Capitol
Carrollton, Texas
Catholic bishops of Texas
Caves of Texas
commons:Category:Caves of Texas
Central Texas tornado outbreak
Chinatown, Houston
Chuck Norris
Church of the SubGenius
Clark, Edward
Clemens, Roger
Clements, Bill
Climate of Texas
:Category:Climate of Texas
commons:Category:Climate of Texas
College Station, Texas
Colorado River of Texas
Columbia, Republic of Texas, republican capital 1836-1837
Communications in Texas
commons:Category:Communications in Texas
Compaq Center (Houston)
CompUSA
Connally, John
ConocoPhillips
Conroe, Texas
Continental Airlines

Convention centers in Texas
commons:Category:Convention centers in Texas
Convention of 1836
Cornyn, John
Corpus Christi International Airport
Corpus Christi, Texas
Cotton Hill
Counties of Texas
Cowboy
Craft, Juanita
Crockett, Davy
Cruz, Ted
Cuban, Mark
Cuisine of Texas
Culture of Texas
:Category:Texas culture
commons:Category:Texas culture

D
The Daily Cougar
Dale Gribble
Dallas Area Rapid Transit
Dallas Cowboys
Dallas Desperados
Dallas/Fort Worth International Airport
Dallas/Fort Worth Metroplex
Dallas Love Field
Dallas Mavericks
The Dallas Morning News
Dallas Observer
Dallas Stars
Dallas (1978 TV series)
Dallas, Texas
The Dateline Downtown
Dealey Plaza
Debbie Does Dallas
Deep Ellum
Dell Computer
Demographics of Texas
:Category:Demographics of Texas
Demographics of Dallas-Fort Worth
Demographics of Houston
Dell, Michael
Denison, Texas
Denton, Texas
Dixie Chicks
Dobie, J. Frank
Don't Mess with Texas
Downtown Houston
Dr Pepper

E
Eagle Pass, Texas
East Texas
East Texas Baptist University
East Texas Musical Convention
Echo Hill Ranch
Economy of Texas
:Category:Economy of Texas
commons:Category:Economy of Texas
Edinburg Roadrunners
Edinburg, Texas
Education in Texas
:Category:Education in Texas
commons:Category:Education in Texas
Edwards Plateau
Elections in the State of Texas
:Category:Texas elections
commons:Category:Texas elections
Electronic Data Systems
Ellington Field
El Paso International Airport
El Paso, Texas
Elections in the State of Texas
Enchanted Rock
Enron
Environment of Texas
commons:Category:Environment of Texas
Estuaries of Texas
Excel Communications
Extreme points of Texas
ExxonMobil

F

Fair Park
Faulk, John Henry
F.C. Dallas
Festivals in Texas
commons:Category:Festivals in Texas
Flag of the State of Texas
The Flame
Flyleaf
Fort Parker Massacre
Fort Worth Cats
Fort Worth Dallas Birthing Project
Fort Worth, Texas
Forts in Texas
Fort Bliss
:Category:Forts in Texas
commons:Category:Forts in Texas
Fountain Place
Francisco Vásquez de Coronado
Franklin Mountains
Fredericksburg, Texas
Friedman, Kinky
Frisco RoughRiders
Frisco, Texas
Frontier Fiesta
Frito Lay
FUNimation

G
Galveston, Texas, republican capital 1836
Galveston County, Texas
Galveston Hurricane of 1900
Gambling in Texas
Gardens in Texas
commons:Category:Gardens in Texas
Garland, Texas
Geography of Texas
:Category:Geography of Texas
commons:Category:Geography of Texas
Geology of Texas
:Category:Geology of Texas
commons:Category:Geology of Texas
Geology of Wichita Falls, Texas
George Bush Intercontinental Airport
Ghost towns in Texas
:Category:Ghost towns in Texas
commons:Category:Ghost towns in Texas
Gilmore, Jimmie Dale
Golf clubs and courses in Texas
Goodnight, Charles
Goodnight-Loving Trail
Government of the State of Texas  website
:Category:Government of Texas
commons:Category:Government of Texas
Governor of the State of Texas
List of governors of Texas
Grace Point Church
Gramm, Phil
Grand Prairie, Texas
Guadalupe River (Texas)

H
Hagerman, Amber
Hall of State
Halliburton
Hank Hill
Harlingen, Texas
Harrisburgh, Republic of Texas, republican capital 1836
Hawkins, Aubrey
Heritage railroads in Texas
commons:Category:Heritage railroads in Texas
Hicks, Tom
Highway system of Texas
Hilton College of Hotel and Restaurant Management
Hilton University of Houston
Hiking trails in Texas
commons:Category:Hiking trails in Texas
Hines College of Architecture
Hightower, Jim
Hippie Hollow Park
 Hispanics and Latinos in Texas
 History of African Americans in Dallas-Ft. Worth
 History of African Americans in Houston
 History of African Americans in San Antonio
 History of African Americans in Texas
History of Houston
 History of Mexican-Americans in Texas
 History of Mexican Americans in Dallas-Fort Worth
 History of Mexican Americans in Houston
History of Sugar Land, Texas
History of Texas
Historical outline of Texas
:Category:History of Texas
commons:Category:History of Texas
Hockaday School, The
Holly, Buddy
Holy Land Foundation for Relief and Development
Hotter'N Hell Hundred
Houston Aeros (1994–2013)
Houston Aeros (WHA)
Houston Astros
Houston Chronicle
Houston Comets
Houston Galleria
Houston Independent School District
Houston Livestock Show and Rodeo
Houston Museum District
Houston Rockets
Houston, Sam
Houston–Sugar Land–Baytown Metropolitan Area (Greater Houston)
Houston Texans
Houston, Texas, republican capital 1837-1839
Houston Zoo
Hurricane Alicia
Husband, Rick
Hutchison, Kay Bailey

I
id Software
Images of Texas
commons:Category:Texas
Inks Dam
Inks Lake
Institute for Christian Studies
Interstate highway routes in Texas
Ireland, John
Irving, Texas
Islands of Texas

J
JCPenney
John Connally Unit
John F. Kennedy assassination
John Redcorn
John Sealy Hospital
Johnson, Lady Bird
Johnson, Lyndon Baines
Johnston, Albert Sidney
Jones, Anson
Jones, Jerry
Joplin, Janis
Jordan, Barbara
Joseph Gribble
JPMorgan Chase Tower - Dallas
JPMorgan Chase Tower - Houston

K
Katy, Texas
Kettle Restaurants
Killeen, Texas
Kimberly-Clark
King of the Hill
King Ranch
Kirk, Ron
Knowles, Beyoncé
Koresh, David
KTRK-TV

L
Laguna Atascosa National Wildlife Refuge
Lake Marble Falls
Lakes in Texas
Lady Bird Lake
Lake Austin
Lake Buchanan
Lake LBJ
Lake Travis
:Category:Lakes of Texas
commons:Category:Lakes of Texas
Lamar, Mirabeau B.
Landmarks in Texas
commons:Category:Landmarks in Texas
Landry, Tom
Lane, Walter P.
Laredo International Airport
Laredo, Texas
Las Colinas
Lee College
Legal status of Texas
Leland, Mickey
LeTourneau University
Lipan Apache language
Lipan Apache people
Lists related to the State of Texas:
List of airports in Texas
List of census statistical areas in Texas
List of cities in Texas
List of colleges and universities in Texas
List of companies in Texas
List of counties in Texas
List of county name etymologies in Texas
List of county seat name etymologies in Texas
List of farm to market roads in Texas
List of forts in Texas
List of freeways in the Dallas-Fort Worth area
List of ghost towns in Texas
List of governors of Texas
List of high schools in Texas
List of highways in the Houston area
List of highways in the San Antonio area
List of hospitals in Texas
List of individuals executed in Texas
List of Interstate highway routes in Texas
List of islands of Texas
List of lakes in Texas
List of law enforcement agencies in Texas
List of mayors of Austin, Texas
List of mayors of Dallas, Texas
List of mayors of El Paso, Texas
List of mayors of Fort Worth, Texas
List of mayors of Houston, Texas
List of mayors of Plano, Texas
List of mayors of San Antonio, Texas
List of museums in Texas
List of National Historic Landmarks in Texas
List of newspapers in Texas
List of people from Texas
List of radio stations in Texas
List of railroads in Texas
List of Registered Historic Places in Texas
List of rivers of Texas
List of school districts in Texas
List of state forests in Texas
List of state highway loops in Texas
List of state highway spurs in Texas
List of state highways in Texas
List of state parks in Texas
List of state prisons in Texas
List of symbols of the State of Texas
List of telephone area codes in Texas
List of television stations in Texas
List of United States congressional delegations from Texas
List of United States congressional districts in Texas
List of United States representatives from Texas
List of United States senators from Texas
List of U.S. highway routes in Texas
Literature of Texas
Llano Estacado
Llano River
Llano Uplift
Longhorn Dam
Longview, Texas
Louisiana Purchase of 1803
Love Field
Lower Colorado River Authority
Luanne Platter
Lubbock, Francis
Lubbock International Airport
Lubbock, Texas
Lyndon B. Johnson Space Center

M
Machemehl, Charles W.
Machemehl, Chuck
Machemehl, Louis A.
Machemehl, Paul
McAllen, Texas
McAllen-Miller International Airport
McClure, Jessica
Magnolia Hotel (Dallas, Texas)
Magnolia Hotel (Houston)
Mansfield Dam
Mass shootings in Texas
Maps of Texas
commons:Category:Maps of Texas
Marshall, Texas
Mesquite Championship Rodeo
Mesquite, Texas
Metropolitan Transit Authority of Harris County, Texas
METRORail
Mexican Texas
Michelson Museum of Art
Midland, Texas
Miller, Laura
Minute Maid Park
 Missing in Brooks County
Mission, Texas
Monuments and memorials in Texas
commons:Category:Monuments and memorials in Texas
Moody Gardens
Moores School of Music
Mountains of Texas
commons:Category:Mountains of Texas
Mount Bonnell
Murrah, Pendleton
Museums in Texas
:Category:Museums in Texas
commons:Category:Museums in Texas
Music of Texas
:Category:Music of Texas
commons:Category:Music of Texas
:Category:Musical groups from Texas
:Category:Musicians from Texas
Mustangs at Las Colinas

N
Nancy Gribble
National Forests of Texas
commons:Category:National Forests of Texas
Natural history of Texas
commons:Category:Natural history of Texas
Nature centers in Texas
commons:Category:Nature centers in Texas
Neiman Marcus
New Braunfels, Texas

O
Odessa, Texas
Option fee (Texas)
Orange, Texas
Orbison, Roy
Outdoor sculptures in Texas
commons:Category:Outdoor sculptures in Texas

P
Palo Duro Canyon
Parker, Cynthia Ann
Parker, Daniel
Parker, Quanah
Pasadena, Texas
Pecos River
Pedernales River
Peggy Hill
People from Texas
:Category:People from Texas
commons:Category:People from Texas
:Category:People by city in Texas
:Category:People by county in Texas
:Category:People from Texas by occupation
Perry, Rick
Plano, Texas
Poe, Ted
Politics of Texas
:Category:Politics of Texas
commons:Category:Politics of Texas
Port Arthur, Texas
Protected areas of Texas
commons:Category:Protected areas of Texas

Q
Quinn, Paul

R
Radio Shack
Railroad museums in Texas
commons:Category:Railroad museums in Texas
Red Line (Dallas Area Rapid Transit)
Red River of the South
Registered Historic Places in Texas
Redneck
Reliant Astrodome
Reliant Energy
Reliant Park
Reliant Stadium
Religion in Texas
:Category:Religion in Texas
commons:Category:Religion in Texas
Renaissance Tower (Dallas)
Republic of Texas
Republic of Texas (group)
Resendiz, Angel Maturino
Reunion Arena
Rice University
Rice, William Marsh
Richards, Ann
Richardson, Texas
Rick Husband Amarillo International Airport
Rio Grande
Rio Grande Valley
Rio Grande Valley White Wings
Rivas, George
Rock formations in Texas 
commons:Category:Rock formations in Texas
Roller coasters in Texas
commons:Category:Roller coasters in Texas
Round Rock Express
Ryan, Nolan

S
Sabine River
St. Edward's University
Saint Mary's University of San Antonio
San Angelo Colts
San Angelo, Texas
San Antonio Bay
San Antonio de Béxar, colonial capital 1772-1824
San Antonio Area Foundation
San Antonio International Airport
San Antonio Silver Stars
San Antonio Spurs
San Antonio, Texas
San Benito, Texas
San Jacinto College
San José Island (Texas)
San Marcos, Texas
Santa Ana National Wildlife Refuge
Schlitterbahn
Seal of the State of Texas
Seguin, Texas
Selena
Selena, Death of
Service Corporation International
Settlements in Texas
Cities in Texas
Towns in Texas
Villages in Texas
Census Designated Places in Texas
Other unincorporated communities in Texas
List of ghost towns in Texas
Sharpstown scandal
Sherman, Texas
Shasta
Shiner beer
Sid Richardson College
Six Flags
Six Flags Astroworld
Smith, Preston
South by Southwest Festival
Southeast Texas Regional Airport
Southern Methodist University
South Padre Island, Texas
South Park Mexican
Southwest Airlines
Southwest Conference
Spindletop
Sports in Texas
:Category:Sports in Texas
commons:Category:Sports in Texas
:Category:Sports venues in Texas
commons:Category:Sports venues in Texas
Max Starcke Dam
State Fair
State Fair of Texas
State of Texas  website
Government of the State of Texas
:Category:Government of Texas
commons:Category:Government of Texas
Strauss, Annette
Structures in Texas
commons:Category:Buildings and structures in Texas
Sugar Land Regional Airport
Sugar Land, Texas
Superconducting Super Collider
Superfund sites in Texas
Symbols of the State of Texas
:Category:Symbols of Texas
commons:Category:Symbols of Texas
the

T
Tandy Center Subway
Tejanos
Telecommunications in Texas
commons:Category:Communications in Texas
Telephone area codes in Texas
Temple, Texas
Texans for Fiscal Accountability
Texans for Vaccine Choice
Texarkana, Texas
Texas  website
:Category:Texas
commons:Category:Texas
commons:Category:Maps of Texas
Texas 7
Texas A&M University
Texas A&M University at Galveston
Texas Annexation
Texas Asia Society
Texas Association of Licensed Investigators
Texas Border Coalition
Texas Bureau of Child and Animal Protection
Texas Cart War
Texas Centennial Exposition
Texas Christian University
Texas City Disaster
Texas City, Texas
Texas Co-op Power magazine
Texas Civil Service Testing
Texas County & District Retirement System
Texas Declaration of Independence
Texas Fair Trade Coalition
Texas fireball
Texas Fund Trapping Notice
Texas Gas Service
Texas Health and Science University
Texas Highland Lakes
Texas Highway Patrol Association
Texas Hill Country
Texas Historical Commission
Texas in the American Civil War
Texas Instruments
Texas Junior Golf Tour
Texas Legation
Texas Legislature
Texas literature
Texas Longhorn (cattle)
Texas Longhorn sports teams (The University of Texas)
Texas Medical Center
Texas Millionaires Chorus
Texas Mini GP Series
Texas Municipal Retirement System
Texas Night Train
Texas Our Texas
Texas Panhandle
Texas Parks and Wildlife Department
Texas Policy Evaluation Project
Texas Psychological Association
Texas Rangers (baseball)
Texas Ranger Division (the "Texas Rangers")
Texas Revolution
Texas Soaring Association
Texas Southern University
Texas State Capitol
Texas State Guard
Texas State Guard Commanding General's Individual Award
Texas State University
Texas Statutes
Texas Tech University
Texas Woman's University
Tex-Mex cuisine
Thanks-Giving Square
Theatres in Texas
commons:Category:Theatres in Texas
Timeline of the Texas Revolution
Toll bridges, tunnels, and ferries in Texas
Tom Miller Dam
Tonkawa
Tourism in Texas  website
commons:Category:Tourism in Texas
Toyota Center (Houston)
Transportation in Texas
:Category:Transportation in Texas
commons:Category:Transport in Texas
Travis, William B.
Treaty Oak (Austin, Texas)
Treaty of Guadalupe Hidalgo of 1848
Trinity Metro
Trinity Railway Express
Trinity River
Tropical Storm Allison
Turtle Bayou Resolutions
TX – United States Postal Service postal code for the State of Texas
Tyler, Texas

U
United States of America
States of the United States of America
United States census statistical areas of Texas
United States congressional delegations from Texas
United States congressional districts in Texas
United States Court of Appeals for the Fifth Circuit
United States District Court for the Eastern District of Texas
United States District Court for the Northern District of Texas
United States District Court for the Southern District of Texas
United States District Court for the Western District of Texas
United States representatives from Texas
United States senators from Texas
University of Houston
University of Houston–Clear Lake
University of Houston–Downtown
University of Houston Law Center
University of Houston System
University of Houston–Victoria
University of North Texas
University of Texas at Austin
University of Texas at El Paso
University of Texas Medical Branch at Galveston
University of Texas at San Antonio
University of Texas System
Unpuncliegut
Uptown Houston
U.S. highway routes in Texas
US-TX – ISO 3166-2:US region code for the State of Texas
USS Texas

V
Van Zandt, Isaac
Vaughan, Stevie Ray
Velasco, Republic of Texas, republican capital 1836
Victoria, Texas
Voice of Hope, a non-profit organization in Dallas, Texas

W
Waco, Texas
Walker, Texas Ranger
Waller, Edwin
Walnut Springs Park
Washington, Republic of Texas, republican capital 1836
Water parks in Texas
Waterfalls of Texas
commons:Category:Waterfalls of Texas
Wells Fargo Plaza (El Paso)
Wells Fargo Plaza (Houston)
West Texas
West Texas A&M University
Whataburger
Wheatley Place
White, D. P.
White, Mark
Whitman, Charles
Wichita Falls, Texas
Wikimedia
Wikimedia Commons:Category:Texas
commons:Category:Maps of Texas
Wikinews:Category:Texas
Wikinews:Portal:Texas
Wikipedia Category:Texas
Wikipedia Portal:Texas
Wikipedia:WikiProject Texas
:Category:WikiProject Texas articles
Wikipedia:WikiProject Texas#Participants
Wiley College
William P. Hobby Airport
Williams Tower
Wind power in Texas
Wines of Texas
Wirtz Dam
Women's Shelter of South Texas

X
XIT Ranch

Y
Yates, Andrea Pia

Z
Zellweger, Renée
Zoos in Texas
commons:Category:Zoos in Texas
ZZ Top

See also

Topic overview:
Texas
Outline of Texas

Topic articles

.
 
Texas